The Institut d'Estudis Occitans  (English: Occitan Studies Institute or Institute for Occitan Studies), or IEO, is a cultural association that was founded in 1945 by a group of Occitan and French writers including Jean Cassou, Tristan Tzara, Ismaël Girard, Max Roqueta, Renat Nelli, and Pierre Rouquette. It aims at both maintaining and developing the Occitan language and influence of Occitania through the supervision, harmonization and normalization of everything dealing with the Occitan life and culture. 

The IEO is divided into regional and departmental sections and local circles that cover the whole of the country from the cities (called in vernacular language) of Lemòtges and Clarmont up north to Marselha, Tolosa or Bordèu down south. A number of carefully targeted activities are sponsored by groups and other associations affiliated with the Institute, or by members themselves. The IEO is the Occitan counterpart of the Institut d'Estudis Catalans. Its motto is La fe sens òbras mòrta es ("Faith without works is dead").

History
A first Institute for Occitan Studies was created around 1923 as a section of the League of Meridional Homeland (Ligue de la Patrie Méridionale), but had a short lifespan.

In 1930, the Society for Occitan Studies (SEO) was founded by Joseph Anglade and Valère Bernard, with Louis Alibert as secretary.

At the end of World War II, as both the Felibrige and the SEO had been discredited by the involvement of some of their leaders in the collaboration, some occitanists decided to create a new institution, the IEO, with a clear message: the IEO is an offspring of the Resistance.

Presidents of the IEO

Affiliates

IEO-Ideco: Ideco is the publishing house and distribution network of the Institut d'Estudis Occitans. It is based in Puèglaurenç.

EOE: the EOE or Escòla Occitana d'Estiu is the Occitan summer school. It is one-week long and takes place every year in August in Vilanuèva d'Òlt.

UOE: the UOE or Universitat Occitana d'Estiu is the Occitan summer university. It is one-week long and takes place every year in Nîmes.

Controversy
The IEO went through a number of crises throughout its history, the most serious of which in the late 1970s and early 1980s when two ideologies clashed: the populist view of Ives Roqueta, and a more academic one promoted by Robèrt Lafont. This confrontation led to the eviction of Lafont and his followers from the Institute, which nearly sealed the fate of all scientific projects at the IEO, with many researchers finding jobs in universities and the Associacion Internacionala d'Estudis Occitans ("International Occitan Studies Association"). Most linguists among them migrated also to the Gidilòc and the Conselh de la Lenga Occitana ("Occitan Language Council"). Nevertheless, the IEO has remained the leading organization in the field of cultural life and by far the most popular body among Occitan activists.

References

External links
 

1945 establishments in France
Occitan language
Organizations established in 1945